The Vianden Pumped Storage Plant is located just north of Vianden in Diekirch District, Luxembourg. The power plant uses the pumped-storage hydroelectric method to generate electricity and serves as a peaking power plant. Its lower reservoir is located on the Our River, bordering Germany, and the upper is elevated above on the nearby Saint Nicholas Mountain. Construction on the plant began in 1959 and the first pump-generators were commissioned in 1962. The plant generates an average of  annually but of course consumes even more. Generally the efficiency of this energy storage method is around 70–80%. The plant is owned by Société électrique de l'Our and RWE.

Background
Planning for the project began in 1925 but the idea failed due to a lack of funding and political pressure. On 10 July 1958, a treaty was signed between Luxembourg and the German state of Rhineland-Palatinate, which also shares the Our River, allowing construction. Construction began in August 1959. The first four pump-generators were commissioned in the winter of 1962/63 and five through nine in 1964. The official inauguration of the plant was held on 17 April 1964. Construction on a tenth pump-generator began in 1970 and was operational in late 1976. It required the expansion of the upper reservoir, known as Upper Reservoir II.

Second expansion
Planning for a  eleventh unit began in 2006 and the designs were completed in 2009 by Lahmeyer International. Construction on the unit began in January 2010. To accomplish this, the upper reservoir wall will be raised  and the lower Vianden Dam raised . Additionally, a new cavern and set of tunnels just east of the main power cavern will be constructed to house the turbine-generator and penstock. Excavation of these tunnels and caverns was completed on 31 May 2011. On 15 June 2010, Upper Reservoir I was drained to install a new intake structure, which was completed in November 2010. Construction on the new suction/discharge pipe began on 16 May 2011. A cofferdam was constructed around the site in the lower reservoir. The entire expansion is expected to be complete in late 2013.

Design and operation
 
The power plant consists of two reservoirs (upper and lower), two power stations and appurtenant structures such as tunnels, intakes and transformers. The upper reservoir for the plant is separated into two sections, I & II. It is formed by a continuous dam and both sections are divided by a dam with floodgates. To supply water to the generators and to serve as a discharge for the pumps, both Upper Reservoirs I & II have combined intakes/outlets. Upper Reservoir I primarily supplies the main powerhouse with water and Upper Reservoir II supplies a secondary powerhouse with water although both reservoirs are at the same altitude and can balance one another. 

Water from Upper Reservoir I is sent to the main power house, which contains nine Francis pump-turbine-generators, via a system of tunnels and penstocks. Each of the nine pump-generators can discharge  of water when generating electricity and can pump  back to the upper reservoir when in pumping mode. Upper Reservoir II's intake/outlet sends water down to the secondary powerhouse which contains one Francis turbine-pump-generator. This pump-generator can discharge  of water and can pump .

Water is pumped from the lower reservoir to the upper during periods of low demand, usually during the night for a period of eight hours. When energy demand is high, water from the upper reservoir is used to generate power and meet peak energy demand. The process repeats daily or as needed. When the 200 MW expansion is completed, the size of both the upper and lower reservoirs will be expanded and the installed generating capacity of the power plant will increase from 1,096 MW to 1,296 MW.

See also
List of pumped-storage hydroelectric power stations
Esch-sur-Sûre Dam

References

Energy infrastructure completed in 1964
Pumped-storage hydroelectric power stations in Luxembourg
1964 establishments in Luxembourg